The Hongguang railway station is a railway station of Lanzhou–Xinjiang Railway. The station located in Yizhou District, Hami, Xinjiang, China.

See also
Lanzhou–Xinjiang Railway

Railway stations in Xinjiang
Railway stations in China opened in 1959
Stations on the Lanzhou-Xinjiang Railway
1959 establishments in China